Christina Björk (born July 27, 1938) is a Swedish writer and children's book author.

She was born in Stockholm and studied at the Graphic Institute there. She then worked as a graphics designer for a magazine; there she met Lena Anderson who would later work with Björk on several books. She next worked in children's television programming for Sveriges Television. From 1975 to 1980, she was editor for the children's page of the Dagens Nyheter newspaper. In 1985, she published Linnea i målarens trädgård with illustrations by Anderson; an English translation Linnea in Monet's Garden was published two years later. The book is now available in more than 15 languages. A short film was later produced with Björk as director.

Awards
In 1988, she was awarded the Astrid Lindgren Prize. In the same year, she was awarded the Deutscher Jugendliteraturpreis for Linnea i målarens trädgård. She is an honorary member of the Swedish Academy for Children's Books.

Selected works 
 Linneas årsbok, children's almanac (1982), received the Deutscher Jugendliteraturpreis, translated as Linnea's Almanac (1989)
 Sagan om Alice i verkligheten (1993), translated as The Other Alice: The Story of Alice Liddell and Alice in Wonderland (1993)
 Vendela i Venedig (1999), translated as Vendela in Venice, received the Mildred L. Batchelder Award

References

External links 
 

1938 births
Living people
Swedish women children's writers
Swedish children's writers
Swedish film directors